Parsonsfield may refer to:
Parsonsfield (band), American folk rock group
Parsonsfield, Maine, a town in the U.S. state of Maine